The North Country National Scenic Trail, generally known as the North Country Trail or simply the NCT, is a footpath stretching over  from Middlebury  in central Vermont to Lake Sakakawea State Park in central North Dakota in the United States; connecting both the Long Trail and the Appalachian Trail with the Lewis and Clark Trail. Passing through the eight states of Vermont, New York, Pennsylvania, Ohio, Michigan, Wisconsin, Minnesota and North Dakota, it is the longest of the eleven National Scenic Trails authorized by Congress. As of early 2019, 3,129 miles (5,036 km) of the trail is in place.

The NCT is administered by the National Park Service, managed by federal, state, and local agencies, and built and maintained primarily by the volunteers of the North Country Trail Association (NCTA) and its partners. The 28 chapters of the NCTA, its 3,200+ members and each affiliate organization have assumed responsibility for trail construction and maintenance of a specific section of the NCT.

History
The NCT was created on March 5, 1980, by an amendment to the National Trails System Act. When the Trail was established in 1980, portions of it were designed to follow the already existing Finger Lakes (New York), Baker (Pennsylvania), and Buckeye (Ohio) Trails. Their sponsoring organizations became affiliates of the North Country Trail Association and agreed to maintain those portions of their trails to be used by the North Country National Scenic Trail. The Northwestern Ohio Rails-to-Trails Association joined later to help create a link between the Buckeye Trail in Ohio and newly constructed trail in Michigan; the Superior Hiking Trail Association, Border Route Trail Association, and the Kekekabic Trail Club joined when it was proposed that the North Country National Scenic Trail route through Minnesota be changed to include an already-completed section of the Superior Hiking Trail along Lake Superior, and the Kekekabic and Border Route Trails along the Canada–US border in Minnesota's Arrowhead Region. Over the years, legislation was introduced in both the U.S. House of Representatives and U.S. Senate which would authorize the Arrowhead re-route as well as later an extension to the trail's eastern terminus, connecting it with the Appalachian Trail in Vermont.  On March 12, 2019, the North Country Trail reroute and extension was signed into law as part of the omnibus John D. Dingell Jr. Conservation, Management, and Recreation Act.

Route

The trail begins in Vermont and proceeds to the western end of New York state.  It cuts across northwestern Pennsylvania, then follows a southwesterly course through the hilly region of southern Ohio until it nears Cincinnati when it runs north through western Ohio to the hills of SE Michigan.  It continues from southeast Michigan through the western Lower Peninsula, crosses the Straits of Mackinac, and takes a northern route the length of the Upper Peninsula.  After crossing northern Wisconsin, it follows the Lake Superior shore to the northeast corner of Minnesota before turning west through the Boundary Waters Canoe Area Wilderness, and then southwest to the Chippewa National Forest in central northern Minnesota.  The trail enters southeast North Dakota, and continues to its other terminus in the center of the state.

The NCT connects more than 160 public land units, including parks, forests, scenic attractions, wildlife refuges, game areas, and historic sites. The list includes:

Ten National Forest areas (Finger Lakes in New York; Allegheny in Pennsylvania; Wayne in Ohio; Manistee, Hiawatha, and Ottawa in Michigan; Chequamegon in Wisconsin; Superior and Chippewa in Minnesota; and Sheyenne National Grassland in North Dakota)

Four areas of the National Park Service (Michigan's Pictured Rocks National Lakeshore, Wisconsin's St. Croix National Scenic Riverway, New York's Fort Stanwix National Monument, and Ohio's Dayton Aviation Heritage National Historical Park)

Other federal facilities along the NCT include:
Two National Wildlife Refuges (Minnesota's Tamarac and North Dakota's Audubon), two National Fish Hatcheries (Garrison Dam and Valley City, both in North Dakota), and one Waterfowl Production Area (Minnesota's Prairie Wetlands Learning Center in Fergus Falls)
Two Bureau of Reclamation projects (North Dakota's Garrison Diversion Unit's New Rockford and McCluskey Canals)
Seven Army Corps of Engineers impoundments (Lakes Sakakawea and Audubon, Baldhill Dam at Lake Ashtabula, North Dakota, Tom Jenkins Dam and Burr Oak Lake, William H. Harsha Lake [also known as East Fork Lake], Ohio, Tionesta Lake, the Kinzua Dam, and Allegheny Reservoir, Pennsylvania)
The NCT also shares a short stretch with the Lewis & Clark National Historic Trail at Garrison Dam National Fish Hatchery.

The NCT also threads its way through 57 state parks and state historic areas, 47 state forests, 22 state game areas, seven state water conservation districts and at least ten county forests and parks. Several hundred miles of trail eventually will also cross private land thanks to owners who have granted easements across their property.

The center point of the trail is located near the NCTA headquarters in Lowell, Michigan.

Though the eastern terminus of the North Country Trail is only a few miles from Vermont's Long Trail and the Appalachian Trail, there is not yet a connecting trail to either of those trail systems. Efforts are under way to connect to the Appalachian Trail.

Major Intersections
Listed from west to east.

Western terminus: Lake Sakakawea State Park, North Dakota
 at Garrison Dam in North Dakota
 at Brandon Gap in Vermont
Eastern terminus: Maine Junction, Vermont

Trail progress by state

North Dakota
Lake Sakakawea State Park
Garrison Dam National Fish Hatchery
City of Riverdale, North Dakota
Audubon National Wildlife Refuge
Lonetree Wildlife Management Area
Lake Ashtabula, North Dakota
Valley City, North Dakota
Clausen Springs Recreation Area
Fort Ransom State Park
Sheyenne River State Forest
City of Lisbon, North Dakota
Biesterfeldt National Historic Landmark
Sheyenne National Grasslands
City of Abercrombie, North Dakota
Abercrombie State Historic Site

Minnesota
There is a 10-mile loop within the City of Fergus Falls
There is a short segment within Maplewood State Park, within Vergas, and within Frazee
There is a long, contiguous segment from just south of State Highway 34 all the way to State Highway 6 near Remer.  This section passes through Hubbell Pond Wildlife Management Area, Tamarac National Wildlife Refuge, Becker County Forest, the White Earth State Forest, Clearwater County Forest, Itasca State Park, Hubbard County Forest, Paul Bunyan State Forest, and the Chippewa National Forest.
Superior Hiking Trail
Border Route Trail
Kekekabic Trail
Mesabi Trail - the Mesabi Trail will serve as a temporary connector route of the NCT in between Coleraine and Ely while the primitive, off-road trail is planned and built.

Ohio

Wabash Cannonball Trail
Buckeye Trail

New York 
 Finger Lakes Trail

Use
Existing and new sections of the NCT are generally limited to foot travel, including hiking, snowshoeing and cross-country skiing. Other non-motorized uses, such as bicycling and horseback riding are generally limited to areas specifically designed to withstand such use.

About 10,000 people are involved with the NCT in one way or another, either through membership in the North Country Trail Association or membership in one of eight organizations affiliated with the NCTA: the Finger Lakes Trail Conference, the Buckeye Trail Association, the Superior Hiking Trail Association, the Kekekabic Trail Club, the Northwestern Ohio Rails-to-Trails Association, the Butler Outdoor Club, the Rachael Carson Trails Conservancy and the Friends of the Jordan River National Fish Hatchery.

Gallery

See also
Michigan Shore-to-Shore Trail
Ohio River Trail
North Coast Inland Trail

References

External links

North Country Trail Association
The North Country Trail on the National Park Service's website
Journals from the North Country Trail
North Country Trail Video produced by Wisconsin Public Television

National Scenic Trails of the United States
Long-distance trails in the United States
Hiking trails in New York (state)
Hiking trails in Pennsylvania
Hiking trails in Ohio
Hiking trails in Michigan
Hiking trails in Wisconsin
Hiking trails in Minnesota
Hiking trails in North Dakota
Protected areas established in 1980
Allegheny National Forest